Malye Alabukhi 1-ye is a rural locality (a selo) and the administrative center of Maloabukhskoye Rural Settlement, Gribanovsky District, Voronezh Oblast, Russia. The population was 974 as of 2010. There are 9 streets.

Geography 
Malye Alabukhi 1-ye is located 22 km northeast of Gribanovsky (the district's administrative centre) by road. Malye Abukhi 2-ye is the nearest rural locality.

References 

Rural localities in Gribanovsky District